Apocalypse Pompeii is a 2014 American disaster film produced by The Asylum and directed by Ben Demaree. The film stars Adrian Paul, Jhey Castles, John Rhys-Davies, Dylan Vox, Dan Cade. It was filmed in Sofia, Bulgaria, and Pompeii, Italy.

The film was released direct-to-DVD on 8 February 2014. In the tradition of The Asylum's catalog, Apocalypse Pompeii is a mockbuster of the Paul W. S. Anderson film Pompeii.<ref>{{cite web |url=http://tarstarkas.net/2014/01/apocalypse-pompeii-asylum-decides-to-destroy-pompeii-their-way/ |title=Apocalypse Pompei - Asylum decides to destroy Pompeii their way! |author=Tarkas, Tars |date=7 January 2014 |publisher=TarsTarkas.net |accessdate=2014-05-13}}</ref>

Premise
When a Former Special Ops commando visits Pompeii, Italy, his wife and daughter are trapped as Mount Vesuvius erupts with massive force. While his family fights to survive the deadly onslaught of heat and lava, he enlists his former teammates in a daring operation beneath the ruins of Pompeii.He is desparetly in need for help to save his wife and daughter he was rejected multiple times by different people telling there's no way in or out of Pompeii and he'll have to wait until the end which may last for a few days 

On the other side his daughter is busy saving the lives of the other people they went with on the adventure to see Pompeii and she does a very good job by telling them to move and she tries to save them with the knowledge she has of Pompeii also getting the help from a map they carried several people didn't make while they were running away to their safety the final place they trapped in was a abandoned home and they entered it while running away from burning ashes The father tried to contact them on a Walky talky and failed several times to get them but finally did and got the location and it was night by they time and the volcano was getting worse but they manage to escape the nightmare and was save and heading back home.

Cast
Adrian Paul as Jeff Pierce
Jhey Castles as Lynne Pierce
Georgina Beedle as Mykaela Pierce
John Rhys-Davies as Col. Carlo Dillard
Dylan Vox as Kal
Dan Cade as Cade
Constatine Trendafilov as Gianni
Assen Vukushev as Naveen
Alexandra Petrova-Emisti as Rashida
Yordam Yositov as Rosso
Harry Anichkin as Italian Colonel
Vrunda Patel as Christina
Jonas Talkington as Paul
Ralitsa Paskaleva as Alita
J.R. Esposito as Smith
Michael Straub as Herricane
Ivan Panayotov as Soldier
Malin Marinov as Police Officer
Owen Davis as Pilot
Plamen Petkov as Man 1
Deyan Tsuyathov as Man 2
Boris Vashev as Man 3
Lolita Nikolova as Woman
Iveta-Luis Contreras as Mother
Velislav Pavlov as Little Girl's Father
Elayah Roth as Little Girl
Ivo Tonchev as Businessman

Production
This film marks the directing debut for Ben Demaree. Previously he had been a cinematographer on numerous films, including the Sharknado franchise. Shooting took place for 12 days in Sofia, Bulgaria during the month of Sept., and then a few splinter unit days at the real Pompeii in Italy.

Most of the crew were local hires, with only a handful of people flown in from the US, including the sound mixer and steadicam operator. The cast was a mix of US, UK, and local Bulgarians. There were financial advantages to filming in Bulgaria, allowing the film to do bigger stunts including full body burns, setting cars on fire, and using cork bombs for explosions from 'flying volcanic rock'.

Reception
Reviewer Frank Veenstra gave the film 4 out of 10 stars saying "The writing isn't all that great and to be honest, it's a very ridiculous movie but at the same time, it's also a pretty creative one."

Martin Hafer of Influx'' gave the film one out of five stars, citing that "the plot is stupid and the characters are shallow—often coming off as caricatures."

References

External links
 Official site at The Asylum
 
 

2014 direct-to-video films
2014 films
The Asylum films
2014 action films
2010s adventure films
2014 independent films
American action films
American adventure films
American disaster films
Films about volcanoes
Films set in Naples
Films shot in Bulgaria
American independent films
Pompeii in popular culture
Films shot in Italy
2010s English-language films
Films directed by Ben Demaree
2010s American films